Puadh (IAST: [puādha], sometimes anglicized as Poadh or Powadh) is a historic region in north India that comprises parts of present-day Punjab, Haryana, Uttar Pradesh, Himachal Pradesh and the U.T. of Chandigarh, India. It has the Sutlej river in its north and covers the regions immediately south of the Ghaggar river. The people of the area are known as Puadhi and speak the Puadhi dialect of Punjabi. The capital cities of Puadh region are Mohali, Chandigarh,Panchkula

Etymology
The word Puadh is a conjugation of two words of the language: pūrava meaning eastern and āddha meaning half. The term refers to the eastern half of the Punjab region.

Extent

Puadh generally lies between the Sutlej and Ghaggar-Hakra rivers and south, south-east and east of Rupnagar district adjacent to Ambala district (in Haryana).

Punjab
In Punjab:

 Sahibzada Ajit Singh Nagar District: Kurali, Mohali, Kharar; 
 Rupnagar district; Ropar; and Chamkaur Sahib;Morinda
 Fategarh Sahib district: Amloh, [m  and Sirhind;
 Ludhiana district: Pail Doraha,  and Samrala; 
 Patiala district: Rajpura and western part of Patiala district including Patiala city.
 Sangrur district: Malerkotla and other eastern parts of sangrur.

Haryana
In Haryana, Pinjore, Panchkula, Naraingarh, Kalka, Ambala,Shahabad, Karnal and Yamunanagar districts fall within Puadh. Other areas include Jagadhri, Kalesar, Pehowa and  Gulha tehsil of Kaithal district .

These areas are almost have equally share of major communities in different parts such as Rajputs, jats and Gujjars. Kalesar is last village of Haryana in north dominated by Gujjars and jagadhri have large of number Gujjars community Villages whereas Ambala have good share of Rajput voters and 30-50 villages of Gujjars and Jats

Uttar Pradesh
In the state of Uttar Pradesh it is spoken mainly in the Northern districts which border North Haryana districts and South Himachal Pradesh district. The districts where it is spoken are-
 Badshahibagh
 Behat
 Saharanpur 
 Gangoh
 Deoband
These region are mostly dominated by Gujjar/Gurjar community people. Previously most part of these region known as Gurjaristan

Himachal Pradesh
Nalagarh, Baddi, Mahlog (Solan district) and Kala Amb (Sirmaur district) in Himachal Pradesh lies in the east of Puadh, which separates the states of Himachal Pradesh and Haryana.

Chandigarh
Chandigarh falls within the Puadh region.

Gallery

Culture

Puadh is often wrongly included in Malwa (Punjab) by the media. The region had its own poets even at Akbar's court such as Mai Banno of Banur. More recent poets include Bhagat Asa Ram Baidwan of Sohana. The Dhadd Sarangi and Kavishri singing originated in Puadh and also different types of Akharas such as that of Rabbi Bhaironpuri. Puadh consists only a small quantity of Punjab. The Majha, Malwa, and Doaba make up majority of the Punjab.

Puadhi language

The dialect of the Punjabi language spoken in Puadh is called Puadhi. It is spoken by the people of Chandigarh, Baltana, Zirakpur, Rajpura, Ghanaur, and Devigarh region of Patiala district, Banur region, villages of Mohali, and some region of Ropar district in Punjab, whereas in Haryana in villages of Ambala and Panchkula district people speak this language. Also, the region of Ismailabad and Shahbad of Kurukshetra speak this language, also a tehsil of Sadhaura of Yamunanagar district.

See also 
Puadhi dialect
Doaba
Malwa
Majha

Notes

References

Regions of Punjab, India
Plains of India
Landforms of Punjab, India